Sir Huw Jeremy Wyndham Thomas  (born 25 February 1958) is a British gastroenterologist at St Mary’s Hospital, London, and professor of Gastrointestinal Genetics at Imperial College London and St Mark's Hospital.

In 2005 he was appointed physician to the Royal Household and in July 2014, head of the Medical Household, the medical section of the Royal Household of the British monarch, and Physician to the Queen. Thomas was appointed Knight Commander of the Royal Victorian Order (KCVO) in the 2021 New Year Honours.

Early life and education
Huw Thomas was born on 25 February 1958 in London, England. He was educated at Harrow School. He studied natural sciences at Trinity College, Cambridge, graduating with a Bachelor of Arts (BA) degree in 1979: following tradition, his BA was promoted to a Master of Arts (MA Cantab) degree. He then undertook further studies in medicine at the London Hospital Medical College, completing his Bachelor of Medicine, Bachelor of Surgery (MBBS) degree in 1982. He later undertook postgraduate research at the Imperial Cancer Research Fund and completed a Doctor of Philosophy (PhD) on molecular genetics of colorectal cancer in 1991 at University College London.

Career
In 1994 Thomas was appointed consultant physician at St Mary's Hospital, London, and director of the Family Cancer Clinic at St Mark's Hospital, London. In 2007, he became professor of Gastrointestinal Genetics at Imperial College, London.

He is on the staff at King Edward VII's Hospital. In 2005 he was appointed physician to the Royal Household and in July 2014, head of the Medical Household, the medical section of the Royal Household of the British monarch, and Physician to the Queen. Thomas was appointed Knight Commander of the Royal Victorian Order (KCVO) in the 2021 New Year Honours.

References

20th-century British medical doctors
21st-century British medical doctors
Alumni of the London Hospital Medical College
Alumni of Trinity College, Cambridge
Alumni of University College London
British gastroenterologists
British medical researchers
Court physicians
Living people
English people of Welsh descent
1958 births
Physicians of St Mary's Hospital, London
People educated at Harrow School
Knights Commander of the Royal Victorian Order